The Long Fall Back to Earth is the ninth full-length studio album from Jars of Clay. It was released on April 21, 2009 through Gray Matters and Essential Records.

Overview
The Long Fall Back to Earth is the first Jars of Clay album that doesn't include any cover songs since 2002's The Eleventh Hour. The Long Fall Back to Earth is their follow-up to the acclaimed Good Monsters album.

In mid-February, the band released the first single off the album, "Two Hands," with a mix of song clips on their website along with a pre-order package.
The album came in at number 10 on the Jesus Freak Hideout most anticipated albums of 2009.

In late October, the second single, "Heaven", was released.

The album was nominated for a Grammy in the "Best Pop/Contemporary Gospel Album" category.

Composition
The songs dive into pop rock and synth-rock, as well as electronic pop recalling David Bowie, the Flaming Lips, and MGMT. Its sounds have been seen as 80s-influenced.

Track listing

Charts
The album peaked at No. 29 on the Billboard 200 and No. 1 on Billboards Hot Christian Albums.

Awards

In 2010, both the regular and limited edition of the album were nominated for a Dove Award for Recorded Music Packaging of the Year at the 41st GMA Dove Awards, with the limited edition winning the award. The album also won the award for Pop/Contemporary Album of the Year, while the song "Two Hands" was also nominated for Song of the Year.

The Long Fall Back to Earth was also nominated Grammy Award for Best Pop Gospel Album of the Year.

Credits 
Jars of Clay
 Dan Haseltine – vocals
 Charlie Lowell – acoustic piano, keyboards, synthesizers, organ, backing vocals
 Stephen Mason – guitars, backing vocals
 Matthew Odmark – guitars, backing vocals

Additional musicians
 Gabe Ruschival – bass guitar, keyboard bass, percussion
 Jeremy Lutito – drums, percussion, loops, sounds
 Katie Herzig – backing vocals (7, 8)

Choir on "Weapons"
 Jars of Clay, Ben Shive, Joshua V. Smith

Production

 Jars of Clay – producers at Sputnik Sound, Nashville, Tennessee, art direction
 Ron Aniello – producer (4, 5, 6, 11, 12)
 Mitch Dane – engineer
 Vance Powell – engineer (7, 8, 10, 13, 14)
 Joshua V. Smith – assistant engineer 
 Jay Ruston – mixing at TRS West, Sherman Oaks, California
 Stephen Marsh – mastering at Marsh Mastering, Los Angeles, California
 Michelle Box – A&R production 
 Tim Parker – art direction
 Kharyn Hill – photography 
 Brandy St. John – stylist
 Denika Bedrossian – hair, make-up

Notes

2009 albums
Jars of Clay albums
Essential Records (Christian) albums
Gray Matters albums